Pilchuck Glass School is an international center for glass art education. The school was founded in 1971 by Dale Chihuly, Ruth Tamura, Anne Gould Hauberg (1917-2016), and John H  Hauberg (1916-2002). The campus is located on a former tree farm in Stanwood, Washington in the United States. The administrative offices are located in Seattle. The name "Pilchuck" comes from the local Native American language and translates to "red water" in reference to the Pilchuck River. Pilchuck offers one, two, or three week resident classes each summer in a broad spectrum of glass techniques as well as residencies for emerging and established artists working in all media.

History
Dale Chihuly, then the head of the glass program at Rhode Island School of Design, and Ruth Tamura, who ran the glass blowing program at California College of Arts and Crafts (CCAC, now California College of the Arts) applied early in 1971 for a grant from the Union of Independent Colleges of Art to operate a summer workshop in the medium of glass. In late spring the sum of $2,000 had been awarded. From the outset, this was planned as an unusual kind of workshop. Without yet having a site, but knowing he wanted to be somewhere in the Seattle area (Chihuly was born in Tacoma), Chihuly distributed posters advertising "the no deposit lots of returns glass, etc. workshop. Free tuition—you provide food and camping equipment." Sketches of lakes and forests and camping decorated the posters.

Through friends and contacts in the Seattle area, Chihuly and Tamura were introduced to John Hauberg and his wife Anne Gould Hauberg. Hauberg offered Chihuly the use of property he owned an hour north of Seattle. The workshop was held there and in time this became the location of the Pilchuck Glass School.

In 1971, the first workshop began with little time for advance preparation of the site. Chihuly and Tamura, along with two other teachers and 18 students, pitched surplus tents, made a makeshift lean-to with toilets and showers, and built a hot shop with glass furnaces (and a roof of sewn-together surplus tents). They began blowing glass just sixteen days after arriving at the Hauberg's tree farm. Some of the glass that was blown was sold at a craft fair in Anacortes nearby, and after the sale was well-received the group held an open house on the site. They sold more and the proceeds were used to pay for their propane. Even so, Chihuly spent far more than the $2,000 grant and ran up a considerable debt. John Hauberg, buoyed by the success of that first summer, paid off the bank loan and agreed to provide the location and financial support for a second summer workshop, and then a third. A few years later, realizing that Pilchuck glass workshops had become a summer mainstay rather than an occasional happening, the Haubergs established the school as a non-profit, solidifying the framework for today's Pilchuck Glass School.

In the first years facilities were primitive, but over time a campus was developed with a series of rustic structures, designed by Thomas Bosworth (who also served as the School's Director for several years). Thomas designed the Hot Shop for the kiln area (1973), Flat Shop for smaller scaled glass crafts (1976), Lodge (1977), faculty cottages, bathhouse, and other buildings; by 1986 there were fifteen structures on the site.

Campus

The campus has more than 60 buildings, including workshops and living quarters.

Summer education program
Offering programs throughout the year, Pilchuck Glass School's most concentrated activities occur from late May through early September when there are consecutive educational sessions, varying from one to three weeks in length, and offering several concurrent hands-on courses exploring different aspects of creating art in glass. Designed for the uninitiated, the intermediate, or the advanced student seeking skills and conceptual challenges with glass, courses are limited in size (typically ten to twelve students) and highlight a focused inquiry into glassmaking techniques and aesthetic directions.

Students explore the creative possibilities of hot and cold glass in such areas as glassblowing, hot-glass sculpting, sand- and kiln-casting, fusing, neon, stained glass, imagery transfer on glass, flameworking, mixed-media sculpture, and engraving. Although enrolled in only one course in a session, students find additional creative resources among other students, instructors, artists in residence, gaffers and staff.

Artist residencies
In addition to summer workshops, Pilchuck also offers residencies for artists of all levels to simply work on their art throughout the year. Resident artists employ Pilchuck's studios and environment to experiment, innovate and create new bodies of work.

Summer Artists in Residence- Established, visual artists are invited to reside on campus for a 17-day session. They become a stimulating force in the educational program, adding insight and experience from different disciplines.

Professional Artists in Residence- Residencies of varying duration throughout the fall, winter, and spring allow independent artists of outstanding accomplishment to create in Pilchuck's studios.

John H. Hauberg Fellowship- This spring residency for up to six outstanding artists in any medium fosters collaboration in support of new work or new research.

Emerging Artists in Residence- This fall program is designed for a group of six artists in the early stages of their careers who need financial support, time and a place to develop individual bodies of work with glass as a focus.

Notable faculty
Sonja Blomdahl
Ann Gardner
Alena Matejkova

Notable alumni
Jeff Ballard
Cynthia Lahti
Olga Volchkova
Therman Statom
David Patchen
Debora Moore
Reji Thomas

References
Notes

External links
Pilchuck Glass School

Glassmaking schools
Education in Snohomish County, Washington
Art schools in Washington (state)
1971 establishments in Washington (state)